On January 15, 1986, forces loyal to Lebanese president Amine Gemayel and Samir Geagea, intelligence chief of the Lebanese Forces (LF), ousted Elie Hobeika from his position as leader of the LF and replaced him with Geagea. The coup came in response to Hobeika's signing of the Syrian-sponsored Tripartite Accord that aimed to put an end to the Lebanese Civil War.

Background
The tussle between Samir Geagea and Elie Hobeika for control over the Lebanese Forces (LF) had started as early as March 1985. That same month, Samir Geagea gained control over the LF after defeating the last leader of the Phalangist militia, Fouad Abou Nader. In May of that same year, however, Elie Hobeika was appointed to lead that unit. In December 1985, Hobeika signed in the name of the LF an agreement with the Syrian government, the Druze Progressive Socialist Party (PSP) led by Walid Jumblatt, and the Shia Muslim Amal Movement headed by Nabih Berri, which became known as the Tripartite Accord. One of the cornerstones of the agreement was the disbandment of Lebanese militia forces. It also provided for initiating political changes that would end Christian dominance of the Lebanese parliament and army.

There was a dispute over whether to retain links with Israel and how to react to Syrian-sponsored negotiations to end the fighting. Hobeika broke LF links with Israel and supported the negotiations between the LF, the Lebanese government, Syria, and Druze leaders such as Walid Jumblatt. Geagea opposed the negotiations which he claimed would make unacceptable concessions to Syria and weaken the Lebanese Christian community's political power.

In October 1985, with negotiations in progress, skirmishes took place between Geagea's supporters and Hobeika's supporters, where hobeika's supporters tried to bribe geagea's supporter's to betray Geagea. In December 1985, a peace agreement, the Tripartite Accord, was reached. It was signed by Hobeika for the LF, but the LF Command Council was split, with only half agreeing with the deal. In addition, the agreement was criticized by the former President of Lebanon Camille Chamoun and leader of the predominately Christian Maronite National Liberal Party (NLP), and by some Maronite Church leaders because they felt that this agreement was one sided favoring the muslim communities in lebanon.

The coup

Samir Geagea and president Amine Gemayel decided not to accept the agreement, with Geagea's LF faction attacking Hobeika's LF Loyalists' positions in east Beirut on 8 January 1986, being backed by the Lebanese Army's 9th Brigade. On 13 January, in a bid to greatly extend Hobeika's own power, his faction stepped up the conflict by assaulting the positions held by the Kataeb Party militia loyal to Amine Gemayel. The Kataeb party leader, Amine Gemayel, was at the time serving as president of Lebanon.

The support of the Kataeb to the pro-Geagea LF faction during the conflict that ensued proved decisive in the defeat of Hobeika, resulting in his ousting from the command of the LF, which was subsequently taken over by the victorious Geagea. The defeated Hobeika escaped from east Beirut in a helicopter and made his way to the town of Zahle in the Syrian-controlled Beqaa Valley, where he rallied his remaining supporters to form the dissident Lebanese Forces – Executive Command (LFEC) militia sponsored by Syria. Later, Geagea attacked the Kataeb that supported him and started a consolidation of power campaign which resulted in crippling the Kataeb.

See also
 Amal Movement
 Lebanese Armed Forces
 Lebanese Civil War
 Lebanese Forces
 Lebanese Forces – Executive Command
 Mountain War (Lebanon)
 Weapons of the Lebanese Civil War
 Young Men (Lebanon)
 9th Infantry Brigade (Lebanon)

Notes

References

Oren Barak, The Lebanese Army – A National institution in a divided society, State University of New York Press, Albany 2009.  – 
Thomas Collelo (ed.), Lebanon: a country study, Library of Congress, Federal Research Division, Headquarters, Department of the Army (DA Pam 550-24), Washington D.C., December 1987 (Third edition 1989). –

Further reading
 Denise Ammoun, Histoire du Liban contemporain: Tome 2 1943-1990, Fayard, Paris 2005.  (in French) – 
 Edgar O'Ballance, Civil War in Lebanon 1975-92, Palgrave Macmillan, London 1998. 
 Éric Micheletti and Yves Debay, Liban – dix jours aux cœur des combats, RAIDS magazine n.º41, October 1989 issue.  (in French)
Joseph Hokayem, L'armée libanaise pendant la guerre: un instrument du pouvoir du président de la République (1975-1985), Lulu.com, Beyrouth 2012. , 1291036601 (in French) – 
 Ken Guest, Lebanon, in Flashpoint! At the Front Line of Today's Wars, Arms and Armour Press, London 1994, pp. 97–111.  
 Matthew S. Gordon, The Gemayels (World Leaders Past & Present), Chelsea House Publishers, 1988. 
 Robert Fisk, Pity the Nation: Lebanon at War, London: Oxford University Press, (3rd ed. 2001). 
 Samuel M. Katz, Lee E. Russel, and Ron Volstad, Armies in Lebanon 1982-84, Men-at-Arms series 165, Osprey Publishing Ltd, London 1985. 
 Samuel M. Katz and Ron Volstad, Arab Armies of the Middle East wars 2, Men-at-Arms series 194, Osprey Publishing Ltd, London 1988.  
 Steven J. Zaloga, Tank battles of the Mid-East Wars (2): The wars of 1973 to the present, Concord Publications, Hong Kong 1998.

External links
Histoire militaire de l'armée libanaise de 1975 à 1990 (in French)

Conflicts in 1986
Battles of the Lebanese Civil War
1986 in Lebanon